Brazilianist (brasilianista, in Brazilian Portuguese) is a scholar, either a non-Brazilian or a Brazilian living abroad, who teaches, conducts research, and publishes about Brazil. Common fields and disciplines are history, anthropology, sociology, political science, geography, literature, and music. There is great diversity of interests amongst Brazilianists.

Origins and use of the term 

The term "Brazilianist" supposedly originated in Brazil in the 1960s or perhaps a little earlier; it was coined to designate scholars from the United States who were receiving grants to study Brazil at the time when the U.S. had special political interests in that country. However, that is a view perhaps a little too narrow as to the motivating factors which led these many social scientists to do research on Brazilian issues.

In the 1970s and well into the 1980s the Brazilian press paid considerable attention to Brazilianists themselves but there  was not much discussion of their arguments and findings. At that time the term "Brazilianist" could even have something of a pejorative tone.

Since the 1990s there has been a greater acknowledgment in Brazil of the body of work produced by Brazilianist scholars.  Brazilianists' studies began to be more actively introduced into curricula at major Brazilian universities..  A major bi-national conference in Washington D.C. led to the book Envisioning Brazil: A Guide to Brazilian Studies in the United States. University of Wisconsin Press, 2005. Edited by Marshall C. Eakin and Paulo Roberto de Almeida. The book was translated as O Brasil dos Brasilianistas: um guia dos estudos sobre o Brasil nos Estados Unidos, 1945-2000''.

Today some of the books produced by Brazilianists are known well beyond academic circles in Brazil.

Brazilian and Portuguese dictionaries define a “Brazilianist” as a scholar, most usually a non-Brazilian, dedicated to Brazilian studies.

List of notable Brazilianists 

The following is a partial list of people who have studied Brazil in a multi-disciplinary fashion and can be considered Brazilianists.

 Roger Bastide
 Bertha Becker
 Leslie Bethell
 Jean Blondel
 Charles Boxer
 Helen Caldwell
 Robert Carneiro
 Ronald H. Chilcote
 Shelton H. Davis
 Carl N. Degler
 Christopher Dunn
 Peter B. Evans
 Philip Fearnside
 Albert Fishlow
 Earl E. Fitz
 Richard Graham
 James N. Green
 John Hemming
 Randal Johnson
 Herbert S. Klein
 Jacques Lambert
 Ruth Landes
 Anthony Leeds
 Jeffrey Lesser
 Robert Levine
 Claude Lévi-Strauss
 Thomas Lovejoy
 Frederick C. Luebke
 Kenneth Maxwell
 David Maybury-Lewis
 Peter J. McDonough
 Betty Jane Meggers
 Alfred Metraux
 Pierre Monbeig
 Charles A. Perrone
 Paul Rivet
 Antonius Robben
 Riordan Roett
 Anthony John R. Russell-Wood
 Wilhelm Schmidt
 Philippe C. Schmitter
 Ronald Schneider
 Stuart B. Schwartz
 Thomas Skidmore
 Stanley J. Stein
 Alfred Stepan
 Georg Thomas
 Thomas J. Trebat
 Maxine Margolis
 Pierre Fatumbi Verger
 Charles Wagley
 Paul Wellman
 John Wirth
 Jean Ziegler
 Christian Feest
 Johann Natterer
 Timothy Power
 Anthony Pereira

References

External links 
 On the Cunning of Imperialist Reason, by Pierre Bourdieu
 Brazil and Brazilianists in the North American context, in Portuguese, University of São Paulo
 The Brazilianist Online
 Brasilianismo, Brazilianists e Discursos Brasileiros (Brazilianism, Brazilianists and Brazilian Discourses) (PDF) by Fernanda Peixoto Massi.
 Weinstein, B. (2016). Am I still a Brazilianist? Revista Brasileira de Historia, 36(72), 1-23. https://doi.org/10.1590/1806-93472016v36n72_011